The Metropolitan City of Venice is a metropolitan city in the Veneto region, Italy, one of ten Metropolitan cities in Italy. Its capital is the city of Venice. It replaced the Province of Venice in 2015 and includes the city of Venice and 43 other municipalities (comuni). It was first created by the reform of local authorities (Law 142/1990) and then established by the Law 56/2014. 
The Metropolitan City of Venice is headed by the Metropolitan Mayor (Sindaco metropolitano) and by the Metropolitan Council (Consiglio metropolitano). Since 15 June 2015, as new mayor of the capital city, Luigi Brugnaro is the first mayor of the Metropolitan City.

History
The area was settled by 11th century BC. According to legend, Antenor fled from Troy, leading the people of Eneti from Paphlagonia to inhabit the shores of the Adriatic. In 102 B.C., The Romans defeated the Cimbri and the Germanic tribes in the area, thus increasing their influence in the region to form the Regio X Venetia et Histria. The exact date when Venice was established in unknown, but about 570 refugees from the hinterland, especially from Aquileia, fled to the islands of the Venetian Lagoon in order to escape the frequent barbaric invasions. At that time, the territory of the province was part of the Byzantine Empire, belonging to the Exarchate of Ravenna. Over the centuries, Venice became more independent and in 697 it had its first Doge. With the destruction of Eracliana in 805, the capital was moved to Rialto (Venice).

In the Middle Ages, Venice became an important maritime republic, completely independent from Byzantium, and began its expansion into the hinterland. In 1260, the Ezzelini family were defeated. Threatened by the expansionist ambitions of the Visconti of Milan, in 1365, Venice began to invade neighbouring territories. By 1410, the Regio X Venetia et Histria had annexed Padua and Verona, and by the 16th century the republic included territories from the Julian Alps to Crema, Istria, Dalmatia, Cyprus and part of the Peloponnese. In 1797, Napoleon invaded the Republic and, following the Treaty of Campo Formio, it was ceded to Austria. After the final defeat of Napoleon, the Austrian Empire founded a province of Venice on the Adriatic. In 2015 this was converted to the current Metropolitan City.

Geography

Facing east on the Northern Adriatic Sea, the Metropolitan City is bordered to the northeast by the Province of Udine and Province of Pordenone, south by the Province of Rovigo, and to the west by the Province of Padua and Province of Treviso. The municipalities of Chioggia, Cavarzere and Cona constitutes an exclave separated from the rest of the Metropolitan City, bordering the provinces of Padua and Rovigo.

The Brenta and Livenza rivers flows through the former province. The Piave River flows into the Adriatic after passing the town of Eraclea. It was first channeled in the 16th century when a long canal was built from the village of Stra to the Adriatic Sea, bypassing Venetian lagoon. A branch of the Brenta, named Naviglio Brenta, was left to connect directly Venice and Padua. The river runs through Stra, Fiesso d'Artico, Dolo, Mira, Oriago and Malcontenta to Fusina in the north-east.

In areas that border the Friuli Venezia Giulia Region, it is estimated that 29% of the population speaks fluent Friulian. The language is officially recognized and has been protected as a minority language since 2006.

Government

List of Metropolitan Mayors of Venice

Metropolitan area
The spatial spread of the Venice metropolitan area has greatly accelerated over recent decades. The Padua-Treviso-Venice Metropolitan Area (PATREVE) or Venice City-Region, in fact, is an urban agglomeration centred on the cities of Padua, Treviso and Venice in the Veneto region of north-east Italy. It is defined statistically and does not correspond to a single area of local government. Administratively it comprises the communes (municipalities) of the 3 cities plus other 240 communes (overall 104 in the province of Padua, 95 in the province of Treviso and 44 in the province of Venice).
The metropolitan area has a total population of 2,600,000.

Main sights

In addition to the city of Venice, the province offers a number of other attractions including Caorle on the Adriatic Coast with its narrow streets, coloured houses and cylindrical bell tower, and Jesolo, with its long sandy beach, tourist attractions and nightlife.

The second largest municipality in the province, Chioggia, on the southern side of the Venetian Lagoon, includes numerous canals, bridges and mansions as well as St. Felice Castle and the Piazza di Vigo.

References

 
Venice